Yehor Maksymovych Hunichev (born 31 December 2003) is a Ukrainian professional footballer who plays as a centre-forward for Ukrainian club Kramatorsk.

References

External links
 
 

2003 births
Living people
People from Sloviansk
Serhiy Bubka College of Olympic Reserve alumni
Ukrainian footballers
Association football forwards
FC Kramatorsk players
Ukrainian First League players
Ukraine youth international footballers
Sportspeople from Donetsk Oblast